The siege of Olomouc took place in 1758 when a Prussian army led by Frederick the Great besieged the Austrian city of Olmütz (now Olomouc, Czech Republic) during the Prussian invasion of Moravia in the Third Silesian War (Seven Years' War). The attempt stalled as the besiegers faced stronger resistance than Frederick had expected. With a lack of supplies and the approach of an Austrian relief force following the Battle of Domstadtl, Frederick abandoned the siege and withdrew from Moravia.

Bibliography
 Szabo, Franz. The Seven Years War in Europe, 1756–1763. Pearson, 2008.

Olomouc
Olomouc
Olomouc
Olomouc
Olomouc
1758 in Austria
Olomouc
Olomouc
Olomouc
Olomouc
History of the Olomouc Region